Daniel Rothballer (born 14 February 1994) is a German curler.

Teams

Men's

Mixed

Mixed doubles

References

External links

Living people
1994 births
German male curlers
Curlers at the 2012 Winter Youth Olympics